The 1886–87 football season marked the formation of Plymouth Argyle Football Club. The team was originally called Argyle F.C.

History
The club was formed in September 1886 by former college and public school students who wished to continue playing the game. The inspiration for the name Argyle is thought to have come from Argyle Terrace, a local street in a suburb of Plymouth called Mutley. At this time organised League football did not exist. Instead "first class matches", otherwise known as "exhibition matches", were arranged on a largely ad hoc basis and supplemented by cup competitions. Official records from these matches are sketchy at best, but what is certain is that the club played its first match on 9 October 1886 against Dunheved College (now Launceston Technology College) in Launceston.

The club continued in this manner, playing matches at numerous venues in the area, until the decision was made to set up a professional club in the city in 1903. Frank Brettell, a football administrator, was invited to achieve this goal and gain entry to the Southern Football League. He achieved them both, Plymouth Argyle Football Club were elected into the Southern Football League and Western Football League that same year, and they played their first match on 1 September 1903 against West Ham United, winning 1–0.

Exhibition Matches

References

Plymouth Argyle F.C. seasons
Argyle F.C.